Darreh Qaleh (also Romanized as Darreh Qal‘eh; also known as Āb Qal‘eh, Asadābād, Nowz̄arābād-e Āb Qal‘eh, and Shahrak-e Abūzār) is a village in Abezhdan Rural District, Abezhdan District, Andika County, Khuzestan Province, Iran. At the 2006 census, its population was 31, in 5 families.

References 

Populated places in Andika County